Sexmagick Ritual was the third full-length LP by Sleep Chamber. The lineup on this recording was John Zewizz, Richard Geller, Lawrence Van Horn, Darlene Victor, Malcolm Smith, Jonathan Briley, and Richard Geller. The recording included material recorded between 1983 and 1986.

The album was pressed in the US by Inner-X-Musick on cassette (without a catalog number), and vinyl LP (under the Inner-X-Musick pseudonym Trinity Records, catalog number SLEEP CHAMBER 002300). In 1991, the recording was reissued by FünfUndVierzig (catalog FÜNFUNDVIERZIG 50) with bonus material. The CD version features two tracks not originally on the cassette and LP ("Leviathan" and "Weapons ov Magick"), and is missing the track "Seduction". The cassette and LP feature different track order, and the song "Nessus" is longer on the cassette version.

LP Track listing
Side One:
 The Vision & Voice
 The Beast
 Flesh Trixsen
Side Two:
 Nessus
 Seduction
 Weapons ov Magick
 Into the Abyss
 Twenty Three

Cassette Track listing
Side One:
 Seduction
 Nessus (Extended Version)
 The Beast
 Weapons ov Magick
 Into the Abyss
 Twenty Three
Side Two:
 Flesh Trixsen

CD Track listing
Side One:
 Flesh Trixsen
 Succubi Circle
 The Beast
 Nessus
 Leviathan
 The Vision & Voice
 Into the Abyss
 Twenty Three
 Weapons ov Magick (recorded live at Marshfield Ranch House, Marshfield, Massachusetts, August 24, 1986)

References
http://www.discogs.com/Sleep-Chamber-Sexmagick-Ritual/master/27110
https://web.archive.org/web/20101113162614/http://www.freewebs.com/theebradmiller/sexmagickritual.htm

1987 albums